The Women's time trial of the 2014 Dutch National Time Trial Championships (NK tijdrijden 2014) will take place in Zaltbommel, the Netherlands, on 25 June 2014. It is the eighth time that Zaltbommel organizes the Dutch National Time Trial Championships. The last time was in 2009. Also Emmen showed interest to organizes the National Time Trial Championships, but will now be the host in 2015.

Ellen van Dijk is the defending champion, who won the national title at the 2013 Dutch National Time Trial Championships.

Preview
Ellen van Dijk is as the defending champion and Time Trial World Champion the main favourite for the title. Her main rivals are Marianne Vos and Loes Gunnewijk.

Results

Final classification

Source

Inverse starting order
All times are (UTC+1).

Source

References

External links

2014
2014 in women's road cycling
2014 in Dutch sport
2014 Dutch National Time Trial Championships - Women's time trial